José de Jesús Ramírez Ruvalcaba (born 21 April 1957) is a Mexican former professional footballer and manager. Previously Ramirez had served under then Mexico national team manager Miguel Mejia as an assistant from 1993 to 1995.

In 2005, Ramirez won the U-17 World Cup with Mexico. Ramírez was named caretaker manager of  the senior Selección de fútbol de México (Mexico national team) on 31 March 2008, after the sacking of Hugo Sánchez, until the permanent appointment of Sven-Göran Eriksson in June 2008.

Career as manager 
In February 2009, he was appointed the new coach of Club América, replacing Argentinian Ramon Diaz.
In the 2009 Torneo Apertura, his first full tournament as manager, América were able to qualify to the playoffs for the first time in three years. América would be eliminated in the quarter-finals against C.F. Monterrey, however. After the disappointing 2010 Torneo Bicentenario which ended with a defeat to Toluca in the quarter-finals, América decided not to renew Ramírez's contract.
On June 16, 2011, “Chucho” will be the Honorary Heat Head Coach when Laredo takes on the West Texas United (Midland) Sockers at the TAMIU Soccer Complex

Managerial statistics

Honours

Manager
Mexico U17
FIFA U-17 World Championship: 2005

Notes

External links
 

1957 births
Living people
Footballers from Mexico City
Association football midfielders
Atlante F.C. footballers
Club Universidad Nacional footballers
Cruz Azul footballers
C.D. Veracruz footballers
Querétaro F.C. footballers
Mexican football managers
Mexico national football team managers
Club América managers
Mexican footballers